Eric Enomamien Aghimien is a Nigerian director, producer, screenwriter and editor. His debut feature film, A Mile from Home won awards at both the 2014 Africa Magic Viewers Choice Awards and the 10th Africa Movie Academy Awards.

Early life
Eric Aghimien was born  in Benin City, Edo State and is the fourth of seven children. At the age of eight while he was in primary school, he began drawing comics and selling same to fellow students. He attended Immaculate Conception College, Benin City and Auchi Polytechnic, Edo State, Nigeria. Eric is naturally gifted with creative artistic abilities which includes; singing, moulding and drawing. His greatest hobby since childhood is; watching movies besides swimming and football.

He obtained a National Diploma in Science Laboratory Technology in 2005. While obtaining his diploma, he was a member of a musical group called Da TED. After his National Diploma, Eric decided to pursue a career in entertainment.

Career
In 2006, Aghimien moved to Lagos from Benin and decided to pursue a career in film. He began his film career in 2007 at a computer training institute where he learnt how to use computers, graphic design and video editing. Eric wanted to study filmmaking abroad but could not raise enough funds to see it through. He continued his learning by sourcing tutorials online.
Eric founded Hills Pictures Movie Academy in 2008 which helps upcoming talents discover, develop and exhibit their talents.

In 2011, he made an experimental short film titled Heckto which was nominated for Best Use of Special Effects and Best Actor at the 2012 International Short Film Festival.
Aghimien also made his first feature film A Mile from Home, an action drama, which received largely positive reviews.

Filmography

Awards and nominations

See also
 List of Nigerian film producers

References

External links

Nigerian film directors
Nigerian film producers
Nigerian screenwriters
1982 births
Living people
Auchi Polytechnic alumni
Nigerian editors